The Pakistan Football Federation League (abbreviated: PFFL), also known as the 'B' Division League, is a Pakistani semi-professional league for men's association football departments and clubs which are in the Pakistan football league system, and is the country's second-tier semi-professional football competition. Contested by 18 departments and clubs, it operates on a system of promotion and relegation with the top-tier Pakistan Premier League.

Each season, the two top-finishing teams from the PFFL's club phase and the departmental phase are automatically promoted to the Pakistan Premier League, and the winner of the final between club phase and departmental phase is crowned as the PFF League champion.

Pakistan Railways is the only club to have won the PFF League two times - their first in 2005–06 and the second in 2013–14. Current champions, Pakistan Navy are the only club to gain promotion to Pakistan Premier League after just one season in the PFF League, as they were relegated at the end of 2013–14 and won the PFF League in 2014–15. Baloch Quetta F.C. (club phase) and Masha United (departmental phase) are the current champions.

History
PFF League was founded in the 2004 to serve as the second division for the newly re-branded Pakistan Premier League. The league's name was originally planned as 'National League Division B'.

Its inaugural season was won by National Bank and Pakistan Public Works Department were the runners-up. Baloch Quetta is the team that has spent the most time in the PFF League, a total of 9 nine seasons.

In February 2020, after six years, Pakistan Football Federation announced the 2020 edition of the PFF League to be held across 4 cities (Quetta, Faisalabad, Karachi, and Lahore).

In 2021, the Pakistan Football Federation signed a partnership with Global Soccer Ventures to launch the Pakistan Football League (PFL), a franchised based football league which will be the main and sole professional football league of Pakistan and will be the country's first tier professional football league within the Pakistan football league system - the PFL will be independent of the semi-professional PPL (current Tier 1) and PFFL (current Tier 2).

Promotion  
The teams which win the PFF League are promoted to the Pakistan Premier League, the first division of Pakistani football.

Structure of the league
The league comprises more than 10 teams with club teams playing in the club leg while the departmental clubs which play through department phase group stages. Winner from both the phases earns promotion to upcoming season of Pakistan Premier League and face each other in the finals to determine the winner of PFF League.

Names

2020 clubs

Results

Champions and runners-up

Relegated teams (from PPL to PFFL)

Notes

References

Football leagues in Pakistan
Football competitions in Pakistan
2004 establishments in Pakistan